Alex Popow (born 9 November 1975 in Lecheria) is a Venezuelan racing driver who competes in the American Le Mans Series and Rolex Sports Car Series for CORE autosport and Starworks Motorsport.

He was champion of the LMPC class in the American Le Mans Series in 2012 and obtained a class victory at the 12 Hours of Sebring in 2012, and an overall win the inaugural Brickyard Grand Prix at Indianapolis Motor Speedway in 2012. Also, he finished second overall in the 2012 24 Hours of Daytona.

Name
Popow's name, which is pronounced "pop-off", is the result of his Eastern European ancestry. During a broadcast on Speed Channel, it was revealed that his family name was originally Popov, but was changed to Popow upon his ancestors' immigration.

Early racing career
Popow began his racing career in his native Venezuela in 1996, winning the Eastern Division Championship for 2000cc cars. He repeated as champion one year later before moving up to the Fiat Palio Cup and Mustang Cup, where he reached success in both championships. Popow was the Expert Class champion in the Palio Cup in both 1998 and 1999, while also earning top honors in the Mustang Cup in 2000 and 2002.

Having won the Formula 2000 Venezuela Championship in 2005, Popow went on to form the first all-Venezuelan team to participate in the Panam-GP series, which took place in six countries, including Venezuela.

Bogota 6 Hours
Considered the most prestigious professional auto racing event in Colombia, Popow has also enjoyed success in the Bogota 6 Hours. He earned a second-place result in his debut in 1997, while also collecting runner-up finishes in 2004 and 2005. Popow was crowned champion of the race in 2011.

Off-road racing
Between 2007 and 2009, Popow competed in the AWA 4x4 Rally Championship, earning a third-place finish in the LUV D-MAX Trophy.

Rolex Sports Car Series
Popow made his Grand-Am debut in 2011, racing in the Rolex Sports Car Series for Starworks Motorsport team. He finished a season-high third at Watkins Glen with Ryan Dalziel and finished 20th in the Daytona Prototype points standings.

In 2012, Popow took his first victory in the inaugural Brickyard Grand Prix Indianapolis Motor Speedway, and obtained two second places and two fourth, so that finished sixth in the drivers' championship.

Popow with Ryan Dalziel achieved one win, two second places and two third in the 2013 Rolex Sports Car Series season, however the poor results obtained at the end of the season, did they finished eighth in the drivers' championship in the DP class. In 2013 Popow won the ‘Jim Trueman’ Award by a landslide and the Starworks Motosport was crowned ‘Sports Car Team of the Year’ by the SPEED Channel.

American Le Mans Series
Popow won the 2012 12 Hours of Sebring in his American Le Mans Series debut, teaming with Burt Frisselle and E. J. Viso in a CORE autosport Oreca FLM09 Prototype Challenge car.  He then went on to win the following ALMS round at Long Beach with Ryan Dalziel.

Four races into the 2012 season, Popow currently leads the ALMS PC Drivers Championship, with four podium finishes to his credit.

Other racing
Popow competed in the Latin America Challenge Formula 2000 Championship, finishing third in 2010 and fourth in 2011. He also took part in the Mexican Supercup Seat Leon Championship in 2011, finishing second.

Additionally, Popow finished third in the 2012 Gulf 12 Hours at Abu Dhabi.

In August 2012, Popow made his NASCAR debut, driving in the Nationwide Series for TriStar Motorsports at Watkins Glen International.

Personal life
Popow is married to Lu-Ann Acosta-Rubio and has two children. He enjoys extreme sports in his free time.

Motorsports career results

NASCAR
(key) (Bold - Pole position awarded by time. Italics - Pole position earned by points standings. * – Most laps led.)

Nationwide Series

 Season still in progress
 not eligible for series points

Complete WeatherTech SportsCar Championship results

References

External links
  
 

Living people
1975 births
Venezuelan racing drivers
Rolex Sports Car Series drivers
American Le Mans Series drivers
NASCAR drivers
24 Hours of Daytona drivers
WeatherTech SportsCar Championship drivers
LATAM Challenge Series drivers
Starworks Motorsport drivers
United Autosports drivers
EuroInternational drivers
Michelin Pilot Challenge drivers
Le Mans Cup drivers